Farrago is a genus of African plants in the grass family.

The only known species is Farrago racemosa, native to the Lindi Region of southeastern Tanzania.

References

Endemic flora of Tanzania
Chloridoideae